Yorktown (initially Allamead) is a ghost town in Lincoln County, Kansas, United States.

History
Allamead was issued a post office in 1880. The post office was renamed Yorktown in 1894, then discontinued in 1906.

References

Former populated places in Lincoln County, Kansas
Former populated places in Kansas